There have been 48 individuals that have served as mayor of Columbus, Ohio, serving 53 distinct mayoralties or consecutive terms in office. The first mayor of Columbus was Jarvis W. Pike. He was appointed by the Burough Council of Columbus in 1816. The first mayor of Columbus to be elected by popular vote was John Brooks in 1834. Five mayors have served non-consecutive terms. Philo H. Olmsted is counted as both the 8th and 12th mayor, Alexander Patton as both the 17th and 19th mayor, James G. Bull as both the 22nd and 24th mayor, George J. Karb as both the 30th and 39th mayor, and Jack Sensenbrenner as both the 46th and 48th mayor. Of the individuals appointed or elected as mayor, five have resigned from office - James Robinson, John Brooks, Warren Jenkins, John G. Miller, and Jim Rhodes. No mayor has died or become permanently disabled while in office. The shortest-serving former mayor is James Robinson, who served only eight months before resigning from office on September 11, 1827. The longest-serving mayor is Michael B. Coleman, who served 16 years and is the only African American to serve as mayor. Andrew Ginther is the current mayor. He took office on January 1, 2016.

Mayors of Columbus

 Political parties

See also

 Government of Columbus, Ohio
Green Lawn Cemetery – Numerous former mayors of Ohio's capital city are interred at this notable cemetery. It is located in the southern section of Columbus, Ohio.
 Timeline of Columbus, Ohio

Notes

References

Bibliography

Books

Newspapers

Further reading

External links

A Look Back: Columbus Mayors – A slide show of 37 images of Columbus mayors.  Includes a list of all mayors with their respective terms in office.  Provided by The Columbus Dispatch, a daily newspaper based in Columbus, Ohio.
Mayors of Columbus, Ohio 1816-2013 at Political Graveyard
A Quarter Century of Mayoral Memories A panel discussion with three mayors of Columbus, Buck Rinehart (1984-1992), Greg Lashutka (1992–2000), and Michael B. Coleman (2000-Present).  The discussion was hosted by The Columbus Metropolitan Club.  Published September 10, 2012 on YouTube; 53 minutes.

Columbus, Ohio